JD Bergman (born September 7, 1984) of Oak Harbor, Ohio, is an American wrestler for New York Athletic Club who represented the United States at the 2010 World Wrestling Championships and 2013 World Wrestling Championships.

High school
Bergman attended Oak Harbor High School in Oak Harbor, Ohio,  from 1999 to 2003. He won the  individual state championship in the Ohio High School Athletic Association (OHSAA) Division II state tournament, winning state titles in 2002 and 2003. After an injury during his sophomore year, Bergman finished his junior and senior years undefeated (85-0), and holds the school record for most wins in a row, with 86.

College
At Ohio State University, Bergman was a four-time NCAA qualifier and three-time NCAA placer, including finishing second in the 2008 NCAA Division I Wrestling Championships. Bergman also placed third as a true freshman in 2004 and fourth in 2007 as a junior. He finished his college career with 129 wins against 36 losses, for a winning percentage of 78%.

International
In 2010, Bergman represented the United States at the 2010 World Wrestling Championships in Moscow in the 96 kilogram weight class. Bergman split his matches, finishing in 10th place with a 1-1 record (besting Farkhod Anakulov of Tajikistan and losing to Iranian Erfan Amiri). Bergman again represented the US in the 2013 World Wrestling Championships, finishing 0-1 and in 25th place.

Bergman has been on seven USA World teams (top three finish in the World/Olympic trials); 2009–2011, 2012–2016 and 2005-2006 in Greco-Roman. Bergman is also a two-time Cerro Pelado champion (2010 and 2015) and a 2014 Brazil Cup champion.

References

American wrestlers
1984 births
Living people
People from Oak Harbor, Ohio